Blanca railway station is the principal railway station in Blanca, Slovenia.

References

External links 
Official site of the Slovenian railways 

Railway stations in Slovenia